Amtsbezirk is a German language designation for a country subdivision. It was used in Prussia from 1874 until 1945 and in the canton of Bern before 1 January 2010.

Types of administrative division